Rural Mount is a historic mansion in Morristown, Tennessee, U.S.. It was built with ashlar stones circa 1799 by frontiersman Alexander Outlaw for his son-in-law, Joseph Hamilton. It was designed in the Federal architectural style. It has been listed on the National Register of Historic Places since July 30, 1975.

References

Houses on the National Register of Historic Places in Tennessee
Federal architecture in Tennessee
Houses completed in 1799
Buildings and structures in Hamblen County, Tennessee
1799 establishments in Tennessee
Morristown, Tennessee